Westgate is a neighbourhood located within the Mitchells Plain urban area of the City of Cape Town in the Western Cape province of South Africa. It is located in the central western part of Mitchells Plain. Westgate Mall is located to the neighbourhood's immediate north on the other side of Morgenster Road.

References

Suburbs of Cape Town